Who You Say I Am is the second studio album by Among the Thirsty. BEC Recordings released the album on March 17, 2015. Among the Thirsty worked with Matt Arcaini, Justin Ebach, and Scotty Wilbanks, in the production of this album.

Critical reception

Awarding the album three and a half stars for CCM Magazine, Matt Conner writes, the songs "are tailor-made for radio play." Alex Caldwell, specifying in a three star review from Jesus Freak Hideout, recognizes, "It seems that Among The Thirsty may too grow beyond the influences and trappings of their radio-friendly sound too. Who You Say I Am shows a band with a knack for a hook and a promising future."

Christian St. John, rating the album four and a half stars at Christian Review Magazine, states, "Who You Say I Am is a breathtaking release." Giving the album a four star review from 365 Days of Inspiring Media, Joshua Andre says, "a compelling and enjoyable album". Logan Merrick, indicating in a four and a half out of five review by Christian Music Review, describes, "this record has authentic lyrics and fun melodies".

Track listing

References

2015 albums
BEC Recordings albums